Vanessa Lee Evigan (born March 18, 1981) is an American actress. She is the daughter of actor Greg Evigan and model and actress Pamela Serpe. She is also the sister of actress Briana Evigan and singer-songwriter Jason Evigan.

In 2001, Evigan appeared in the vocal group Nuance on the PlayStation 2 video game Unison: Rebels of Rhythm & Dance. The group consisted of Evigan, Brianna Hayes and Rachel Riggs playing the characters of Cela, Chilly and Trill, respectively. They were described as "an up-and-coming unsigned R&B/pop group". Their vocal coach was Seth Riggs and they were managed by Larry Rudolph.

Filmography

Film

Television

References

External links

Social Studies Cast Bio

1981 births
Living people
20th-century American actresses
21st-century American actresses
Actresses from Los Angeles
American child actresses
American film actresses
American television actresses
American voice actresses